John Mary Joseph Benedict Chanche, S.S., (October 4, 1795 – July 22, 1852) was an American prelate of the Roman Catholic Church.  He served as the first bishop  Diocese of Natchez in Mississippi from 1841 to 1852. 

Educated at St. Mary's College in Baltimore, Maryland, Chanche became a Sulpician and eventually president of the college.

Biography

Early life 
Chanche was born October 4, 1795, in Baltimore, Maryland. He was born to well-to-do parents, John and Catherine Provost Chanche, who had fled to Baltimore from the French colony of Saint-Domingue (present-day Haiti), where his father had been a merchant, during the Haitian Revolution.

Chanche  was christened August 1795 by then Father William DuBourg. In 1806, Chanche entered St. Mary's Seminary, which was run by the Sulpicians, not far from his home. He received "first tonsure" from Archbishop John Carroll.  Chanche began his theological studies in 1814, and received minor orders from Archbishop Leonard Neale.

Priesthood 
Chanche joined the Society of the Priests of Saint Sulpice and was ordained a priest on June 5, 1819 by Archbishop Ambrose Maréchal. He was then appointed a professor at the school.  In 1833, he was chosen as Master of Ceremonies for the Second Provincial Council of Baltimore, a major step by the bishops of the nation in organizing its structure.  Chanche was named Vice President of the seminary, and in 1834 succeeded Samuel Eccleston, as its President.

Chanche was twice offered the post of coadjutor bishop, first to the Archdiocese of Baltimore and then to the Diocese of Boston, but he declined both appointments.

Bishop of Natchez 

The Diocese of Natchez was created on July 28, 1837, encompassing the entire state of Mississippi. Chanche was appointed as its first bishop by Pope Gregory XVI on December 15, 1840. He was consecrated March 14, 1841 by Archbishop Eccleston at the Baltimore Basilica, assisted by Bishops Benedict Fenwick and John Hughes. 

Arriving at Natchez in May 1841, Chanche met the only priest in the state, Father Brogard, who was only there temporarily. Brogard conducted services in the Mechanics' Hall. Taking up the role of a simple missionary, Chanche began to collect the Catholics and organize a diocese.  Chanche set to work building a diocesan infrastructure.

In 1842, Chanche laid the cornerstone of St. Mary Cathedral, dedicated to Our Lady of Sorrows. In 1847, he asked the Sisters of Charity of Emmitsburg to come to Natchez, where they established Saint Mary's Orphanage.At the First Plenary Council of Baltimore in 1852, Chanche served the role of "chief promoter."

Death and legacy 
John Chanche died on July 22, 1852, in Frederick, Maryland, presumably of cholera.  He was buried in the Cathedral Cemetery in Baltimore. At the time of his death, the diocese had 11 priests, 11 churches erected, and 13 attendant missions.

In 2007, Chanche's remains were exhumed and returned Natchez to be reinterred in a special garden near the Shrine of the Immaculate Conception on the grounds of the original cathedral of his diocese at Natchez, now the Basilica of St. Mary.

The Diocese of Jackson established the Bishop John Joseph Chanche Award for service. "The Chanche medals, named for the first bishop of the diocese, honor those who give of themselves to their parish or faith community. The awards are presented on the weekend closest to the Feast of the Chair of St. Peter, the patronal feast for the Diocese of Jackson."

See also
 Roman Catholic Diocese of Jackson

References

External links
 Bishop John Joseph Chanche, S.S.
 Photographs of a painting of Bishop Chanche
 St. Mary Basilica Natchez, Mississippi

Episcopal succession

1795 births
1852 deaths
19th-century Roman Catholic bishops in the United States
American people of French descent
American people of Haitian descent
Burials at St. Mary Basilica, Natchez
Religious leaders from Baltimore
Roman Catholic bishops in Mississippi
Roman Catholic Diocese of Jackson
St. Mary's Seminary and University alumni
St. Mary's Seminary and University faculty
Sulpician bishops
Sulpicians